The bunchgrass leaf-eared mouse (Phyllotis osilae) is a species of rodent in the family Cricetidae.
It is found in Argentina, Bolivia, and Peru.

References

Musser, G. G. and M. D. Carleton. 2005. Superfamily Muroidea. pp. 894–1531 in Mammal Species of the World a Taxonomic and Geographic Reference. D. E. Wilson and D. M. Reeder eds. Johns Hopkins University Press, Baltimore.

Phyllotis
Mammals described in 1901
Taxonomy articles created by Polbot